John Curley Johnson  (July 2, 1935 – June 12, 2016) was an American football punter who played in the American Football League for the Dallas Texans and the New York Titans / Jets.  He was part of the Jets team that won Super Bowl III.  He also played one season for the National Football League's New York Giants.  He graduated from Woodrow Wilson High School in Dallas, Texas. Johnson played college football at the University of Houston and was drafted in the seventh round of the 1957 NFL Draft by the Pittsburgh Steelers. He died in 2016 at his home in Granbury, Texas.

References

See also
Other American Football League players

1935 births
2016 deaths
American Football League All-Star players
American Football League players
American football punters
Dallas Texans (AFL) players
Houston Cougars football players
New York Giants players
New York Jets players
New York Titans (AFL) players
People from Anna, Texas
People from Granbury, Texas
Players of American football from Texas
Sportspeople from the Dallas–Fort Worth metroplex